Tun Mohammed Hanif bin Omar (born 16 January 1939) is a retired Malaysian police officer who served as the 4th Inspector-General of Royal Malaysia Police from June 1974 to January 1994. He was the longest-serving Inspector General of Police for 20 years.

Born in Teluk Intan, Perak, Hanif Omar became the Malacca Police Chief on 7 September 1970 and later the Selangor Police Chief on 6 December 1971. He was appointed as the Deputy Inspector General of Police on 1 February 1973.

Police career 
Central Malacca Investigating Officer - April 1960

Assistant Jasin District Police Chief, Malacca - 20 November 1960

Assistant Officer in Charge of Criminal Investigation (South) Pahang - 2 December 1960

Special Branch Staff Officer, Bukit Aman, Kuala Lumpur - 16 January 1962

Selangor Special Branch Staff Officer - 8 August 1966

Ipoh District Police Chief, Perak - 20 July 1967

Chief of Staff (Police) of the National Operations Council - 18 May 1969

Head of Selangor Special Branch - 20 December 1969

Malacca Police Chief - 7 September 1970

Selangor Police Chief - 6 December 1971

Director of Special Branch - 31 January 1973

Deputy Inspector General of Police - 1 February 1973

Inspector General of Police - 8 June 1974 to 15 January 1994

During his tenure as Inspector General of Police, he founded the elite counter terrorist unit, Special Actions Unit on 1 January 1975. He also take part command rescue operation in the 1975 AIA building hostage crisis in August 1975. In addition, he also renamed Bluff Road Police Station to Royal Malaysia Police Headquarters, Bukit Aman on 25 March 1975. On 8 June 1976, Hanif announced all police recruit will be served in Police Field Force before being assigned to other unit, this was ensure that all young policemen will be able tackle any emergency situation once they equipped with jungle training.

Honours

Honours of Malaysia
  :
  Officer of the Order of the Defender of the Realm (KMN) (1970)
  Commander of the Order of the Defender of the Realm (PMN) – Tan Sri (1976)
  Grand Commander of the Order of Loyalty to the Crown of Malaysia (SSM) – Tun (1993)
  :
  Recipient of the Distinguished Conduct Medal (PPT) (1969)
  Knight Grand Commander of the Order of the Perak State Crown (SPMP) – Dato’ Seri (1974)
  Knight Grand Commander of the Order of Taming Sari (SPTS) – Dato' Seri Panglima (1978)
  Grand Knight of the Azlanii Royal Family Order (DSA) – Dato' Seri (2009)
  Ordinary Class of the Perak Family Order of Sultan Nazrin Shah (SPSN) – Dato' Seri DiRaja (2016)
  :
  Knight Grand Commander of the Order of the Crown of Johor (SPMJ) – Dato' (1980)
  :
  Grand Knight of the Order of the Crown of Pahang (SIMP) – formerly Dato', now Dato' Indera (1981)
  :
  Knight Commander of the Order of Loyalty to Sultan Abdul Halim Mu'adzam Shah (DHMS) – Dato' Paduka (1990)
  :
  Knight Grand Companion of the Order of Sultan Salahuddin Abdul Aziz Shah (SSSA) – Dato' Seri (1992)
  :
  Knight Grand Commander of the Order of Loyalty to Negeri Sembilan (SPNS) – Dato' Seri Utama (1992)
  :
  Knight Commander of the Order of the Star of Hornbill Sarawak (DA) – Datuk Amar (1993)

Foreign Honours
 :
 Recipient of the Darjah Utama Bakti Cemerlang (DUBC) (1993)

References

Living people
1939 births
People from Perak
Knights Commander of the Order of the Star of Hornbill Sarawak
Malaysian people of Malay descent
Mandailing people
Malaysian Muslims
Malaysian police officers
Malaysian police chiefs
Alumni of the University of Buckingham
Grand Commanders of the Order of Loyalty to the Crown of Malaysia
Commanders of the Order of the Defender of the Realm
Officers of the Order of the Defender of the Realm
Knights Grand Commander of the Order of the Crown of Johor